Dominica has twenty-one, single member constituencies which elect representatives to the House of Assembly of Dominica. These elections occur using the simple-majority (or first-past-the-post) system and representatives typically serve for a term of five years. These constituencies are delineated by the Electoral Boundaries Commission under Chapter 3, Part V of the Constitution of Dominica, and must be reassessed every two to five years.

Current constituencies 
The following is the list of constituencies as at the last general election, 6 December 2019:

References 

Government of Dominica
Politics of Dominica
Constituencies of Dominica